The 1991 Belgian Masters (also referred to as the 1991 Humo Belgian Masters for the purposes of sponsorship) was a professional non-ranking snooker tournament that took place between 17 and 21 September 1991 in Antwerp, Belgium. Mike Hallett won the title, defeating Neal Foulds 9–7 in the final. Hallett was awarded £30,000 prize money as winner, with Foulds receiving £15,000 as runner-up, and losing semi-finalists getting £10,000 each.

Results
Players in bold denote match winners.

References

Belgian Masters
1991 in snooker
1991 in Belgian sport